Spanair S.A. was a Spanish airline, with its head office in the Spanair Building in L'Hospitalet de Llobregat, near Barcelona. Until 2009, it was a subsidiary of the SAS Group; the same parent company in control of Scandinavian Airlines and held slightly under 20% of the company. Spanair provided a scheduled passenger network within Spain and Europe, with an extension to West Africa.  Worldwide charters were also flown for tour companies. Its main hub was Josep Tarradellas Barcelona–El Prat Airport, with focus cities at Adolfo Suárez Madrid–Barajas Airport and Palma de Mallorca Airport. The airline had 3,161 employees and was a Star Alliance member from 2003 until its demise on 27 January 2012.

History 
The airline was established in December 1986 and began operations in March 1988.  It was set up as a joint venture between Scandinavian Airlines and Viajes Marsans, and began operations with European charters.  Long-haul flights to the United States, Mexico and the Dominican Republic were launched in 1991, followed by domestic scheduled flights in March 1994.  The airline flew long-haul flights with Boeing 767-300ER aircraft to Washington and Buenos Aires in the late 1990s.

Spanair joined Star Alliance on 1 May 2003.

SAS announced in a press release 13 June 2007 that it would sell its shares in Spanair. The divestment was cancelled on 19 June 2008 due to SAS not being able to sell for a price that it considered to "reflect the underlying value in Spanair."  On 30 January 2009, however, a one euro bid from group of investors from Catalonia, led by the Consorci de Turisme de Barcelona and Catalana d'Initiatives, was later accepted, whereupon SAS became a minority shareholder.

A report in the British newspaper The Times on the day of the 2008 Madrid crash suggests that staff were threatening strike action due to concerns about the company's viability.

In 2009 the airline asked for public input on a new logo, with a winner being officially confirmed on 13 May 2009. As of June 2009, Spanair began applying the new corporate identity to their aircraft.

On 25 January 2011, the company was in an "Emergency Financial Situation".  The Catalan government approved a €10.5 million loan plan in order to save it. Revenue improved and the company was cutting costs

Financially troubled during its last few years, Spanair ended operations on 27 January 2012, after Qatar Airways pulled out of talks to inject cash into the airline. As a result, SAS had a write-down of 1.7 billion Swedish kronor ($251 million U.S.). Ana Pastor, the development minister of Spain, said that the Spanish government may fine the airline 9 million euros (US$12 million) after breaking serious aviation security rules by shutting down without proper notice. The carrier said all flights will remain suspended, but it did not say whether it planned to file for bankruptcy.

The last passenger flight was JK1326 from Trondheim to Las Palmas.

Corporate affairs

Head office
Spanair's head office was located in the Spanair Building (Edifici Spanair) in L'Hospitalet de Llobregat, near Barcelona.

Previously Spanair's head office was in the Spanair Building on the grounds of Palma de Mallorca Airport in Palma de Mallorca. In 2008, during the changes in ownership, Spanair said that its head office would remain in Palma de Mallorca, despite rumors that the company would relocate its head office to Barcelona.

In 2009 the company announced that it planned to relocate its corporate offices to Barcelona. In May 2009 Spanair made Barcelona its registered domicile. The airline began to search for a site for the Spanair headquarters in Barcelona. In June of that year around 200 employees protested outside of the Spanair offices in Palma, saying that the timetable to move the offices was too hasty.

Service concept
For economy-class passengers traveling within Western Europe the airline offered a buy on board service offering food and drinks for purchase. Spanair also had revamped their own frequent flyer programme which was renamed Spanair Star. It was innovative for allowing members to redeem points immediately, in the form of a discount on a future flight.

Destinations

Codeshare agreements
Spanair had codeshare agreements with the following airlines until of January 2012, Airlines marked with * were members of Star Alliance at the time of Spanair's collapse.

Fleet

Final fleet

The Spanair fleet consisted of the following aircraft at the time of closure.

Retired fleet
Spanair operated the following aircraft before its closure:

Accidents and incidents

On 10 May 2001, Spanair Flight 3203 (McDonnell Douglas MD-83 EC-FXI named "Sunseeker") was substantially damaged when the starboard undercarriage collapsed while landing at Liverpool John Lennon Airport. All 45 passengers and 5 crew members on board safely evacuated from the aircraft by using the escape slides. The substantially-damaged aircraft was repaired and returned to service.
On 20 August 2008 at 14:45 CEST, Spanair Flight 5022 (McDonnell Douglas MD-82 EC-HFP named "Sunbreeze"), crashed with 166 passengers and six crew members on board moments after takeoff at Madrid's Barajas Airport on a scheduled flight to Las Palmas de Gran Canaria. Initially 19 of the 172 people aboard the aircraft survived, but one person died in a hospital three days after the crash. The initial investigation reports no deployment of flaps, with failures in the take-off warning system.

See also
AeBal-Spanair Link
List of airlines of Spain
List of airports in Spain
List of companies of Spain
Transport in Spain

References

External links

Spanair 
Spanair (Archive)
Spanair mobile version  (Archive)
SAS Group 
Spanair MD-82 crash - August 20th 2008 - Investigation and photos

Defunct airlines of Spain
Airlines established in 1986
Airlines disestablished in 2012
Spanish brands
SAS Group
Former Star Alliance members
Spanish companies disestablished in 2012
Spanish companies established in 1986